Bayvil is a hamlet and parish in Pembrokeshire, Wales. It is in the Pembrokeshire Coast National Park. The parish includes most of the village of Felindre Farchog. Together with the parishes of Monington, Moylgrove and most of Nevern, it constitutes the community of Nevern.

History
The name may derive from Norman-French Beauvil, a "pleasant settlement". It is in the heart of Welsh-speaking Pembrokeshire, in the Welsh cantref of Cemais.

The parish appears on a 1578 map of Pembrokeshire. It included the more developed village of Felindre Farchog and part of the estate of Cwmgloyne, owned by the Lloyd family, and which gave its name to the former Cwmgloyne Arms in the nearby settlement of Crosswell. The estate was broken up to be sold in 1899 and part was sold for a total of £17,000. In 1909 the remainder, including the Bayvil portion, 356 acres, reached a bid of £6,550 before being withdrawn. Parts of the estate were bought by tenants.

Parish church
The parish church of St Andrew was built in the early 19th century and is a Grade II* listed building, being a scarce rural example of an Anglican church of the period. It is built from rubble stone, and has a bellcote and slate roof. The font is 12th century. There is a memorial to T. Lloyd dating from about 1850. Having been closed for a period, with the roof being repaired in 1905, the church was reopened for services in 1908. It is now disused and looked after by the Friends of Friendless Churches.

Demographics
Its census populations were: 102 (1801): 124 (1851): 67 (1901): 75 (1951): 44 (1981). The percentage of Welsh speakers was 100 (1891): 96 (1931): 70 (1971).

References

External links 
Bayvil on Genuki
Photographs of Bayvil and surrounding area on Geograph

Villages in Pembrokeshire